Felicité Makounawode (born 26 February 1971) is a Central African Republic judoka. She competed in the women's half-middleweight event at the 1992 Summer Olympics. She was the first woman to represent the Central African Republic at the Olympics.

References

1971 births
Living people
Central African Republic female judoka
Olympic judoka of the Central African Republic
Judoka at the 1992 Summer Olympics
Place of birth missing (living people)